West Eleventh Street Historic District may refer to:

West Eleventh Street Historic District (Dubuque, Iowa), listed on the National Register of Historic Places in Dubuque County, Iowa
West Eleventh Street Historic District (Kansas City, Missouri), listed on the National Register of Historic Places in Jackson County, Missouri